The James Ministry was the sixth Ministry of the Government of Western Australia and was led by Premier Walter James. It succeeded the Second Leake Ministry on 1 July 1902 following the death of the previous Premier, George Leake, on 24 June 1902. The Ministry relied on Independent and Labour support, and the former Ministerial faction opposing them gradually dissolved with members either associating with the new Government or sitting as independents.

At the 1904 election, Labor obtained three seats short of a majority, and when Parliament met, James's government fell on a vote of no confidence when four independents decided to back Labor's Henry Daglish to form government. The Daglish Ministry was sworn in on 10 August 1904.

The members of the James Ministry were:

References

  (no ISBN)

Western Australian ministries
Ministries of Edward VII